The 1973 NBA playoffs was the postseason tournament of the National Basketball Association's 1972–73 season. The tournament concluded with the Eastern Conference champion New York Knicks defeating the Western Conference champion Los Angeles Lakers 4 games to 1 in the NBA Finals. The Knicks won their second (and most recent) NBA title. Willis Reed became the first player to be named NBA Finals MVP twice.

The playoff format was modified, as only the divisional champions qualified automatically; two wild-cards were also added from each conference. Once qualification was determined, the four qualifiers were seeded 1–4 based on record; divisional position no longer mattered. The #1 seed then played #4, and #2 played #3. Because of this new format, New York, the Atlantic Division runner-up, had home-court advantage versus the Baltimore Bullets, the Central Division champion, since the Knicks had the better regular-season record. The Bullets had home-court advantage in the 1972 playoffs versus the Knicks and in the 1971 playoffs versus Philadelphia, even though their record was worse than New York's and Philadelphia's were those seasons, because they had won their division, while the Knicks and Sixers were runners-up.

This was the second straight time (and third in the last 4 years) that the Lakers and Knicks met in the Finals; the Lakers–Knicks rivalry ended with two titles won by the Knicks and one by the Lakers.

This was the Lakers' last appearance in the Finals until 1980; It was New York's last appearance until 1994.

Bracket

Conference semifinals

Eastern Conference semifinals

(1) Boston Celtics vs. (4) Atlanta Hawks

This was the sixth playoff meeting between these two teams, with the Celtics winning four of the first five meetings.

(2) New York Knicks vs. (3) Baltimore Bullets

Last Playoff Game played at The Baltimore Civic Center.

This was the fifth playoff meeting between these two teams, with the Knicks winning three of the previous four meetings.

Western Conference semifinals

(1) Milwaukee Bucks vs. (4) Golden State Warriors

This was the third playoff meeting between these two teams, with the Bucks winning the first two meetings.

(2) Los Angeles Lakers vs. (3) Chicago Bulls

This was the fourth playoff meeting between these two teams, with the Lakers winning the first three meetings.

Conference finals

Eastern Conference finals

(1) Boston Celtics vs. (2) New York Knicks

 The Knicks became the 1st NBA road team to win Game 7 after leading series 3–1. This is also the first time the Celtics have lost a Game 7.

This was the ninth playoff meeting between these two teams, with both teams splitting the first eight meetings.

Western Conference finals

(2) Los Angeles Lakers vs. (4) Golden State Warriors

This was the fourth playoff meeting between these two teams, with the Lakers winning two of the first three meetings.

NBA Finals: (W2) Los Angeles Lakers vs. (E2) New York Knicks

 Wilt Chamberlain's final NBA game.

This was the fifth playoff meeting between these two teams, with the Lakers winning three of the first four meetings.

See also
1973 NBA Finals
1972–73 NBA season

References

External links
Basketball-Reference.com's 1973 NBA Playoffs page

National Basketball Association playoffs
Playoffs

fi:NBA-kausi 1972–1973#Pudotuspelit